Windrim is a surname. Notable people with the surname include:

James H. Windrim (1840–1919), American architect
John T. Windrim (1866–1934), American architect, father of John